Bill Goesling is an American politician and retired United States Navy test pilot who served as a member of Idaho House of Representatives from 2018 to 2020.

Early life and education 
Goesling was born in Cincinnati, Ohio. In 1963, Goesling earned a Bachelor of Arts degree in chemistry from the University of Montana. Goesling the earned a Master of Science degree in applied science and management degrees from Naval Postgraduate School. In 1993, Goesling earned a PhD in education from the University of Idaho.

Career 
Goesling served in the United States Navy as a production pilot and flight instructor. Goesling flew aircraft such as the North American RA-5C Vigilante, A-7, and F-15. In 1989, Goesling retired with a rank of Commander from the United States Navy. Goesling earned a Distinguished Flying Cross.

Goesling became an instructor in ROTC program in Moscow, Idaho.

In 2004, Goesling became a chairman and commissioner of Idaho Public Charter School Commission, serving until 2011. In 2011, Goesling served as a Republican member of the Idaho State Board of Education, until 2016.

On November 6, 2018, Goesling won the election and became a Republican member of Idaho House of Representatives for District 5, seat A, succeeding Paulette Jordan. Goesling defeated Margaret R. Gannon with 51.0% of the votes.

Goesling chose not to run for re-election in 2020.

Personal life 
Goesling is married to Jo Goesling. They have six children and three grandchildren. Goesling and his family live in Moscow, Idaho.

Election history

References

External links 
 Representative Bill Goesling at legislature.idaho.gov
 Bill Goesling at ballotpedia.org
 Bill Goesling at uidaho.edu

Republican Party members of the Idaho House of Representatives
University of Montana alumni
University of Idaho alumni
Year of birth missing (living people)
Living people
21st-century American politicians